Jijimuge is the debut album of Mo Boma, released in 1992 through Extreme Records.

Track listing

Personnel 
Mo Boma
Jamshied Sharifi – synthesizer
Skúli Sverrisson – extended-range bass, fretless bass
Carsten Tiedemann – acoustic guitar, electric guitar, EBow, percussion, production, mixing, recording
Production and additional personnel
Silke – cover art

References 

1992 debut albums
Extreme Records albums
Mo Boma albums